Sumeet Verma (born 18 November 1990) is an Indian cricketer. He has played first-class and List A cricket for Himachal Pradesh.

References

External links
 

1990 births
Living people
Indian cricketers
Himachal Pradesh cricketers
Cricketers from Himachal Pradesh